Wonder Project J2 is a 1996 life simulation video game developed by Givro Corporation and originally published by Enix for the Nintendo 64. It is the sequel to Wonder Project J, which was released earlier in 1994 for the Super Famicom.

Gameplay 

Wonder Project J2 is a bishōjo life simulation game similar to its predecessor, where the player communicates with Josette, a robot who is trying to become human, through her robot, Bird. The player answers her questions on-screen by selecting "yes" or "no". Josette cannot hear or see the player, but learns about the player through successive binary questions. For example, "if I am going to a party should I wear this?", she recalls the answers later throughout the story. The player can command Josette through Bird, though she does not always listen. Player advancement through the game is dependent on how well their teachings mesh with other activities on the island. After teaching Josette a series of fundamental human interactions, the plot-driven second chapter guides Josette through a series of hardships and confrontation with the Siliconian Army.

Synopsis 
Wonder Project J2 takes place after the events of Wonder Project J. Josette is a girl Gijin (robot) created by Dr. Geppetto, who built Pino 15 years prior. Having just completed Josette, the aged doctor had little time to raise her, so the player assists. Messala, antagonist of the previous game, receives orders from king Siliconian XIII to "find the girl who lives on the island of Corlo who is in possession of the J", an object of great power cabable of giving Gijin humanity and realize their dreams. Siliconian armies are dispatched to find the girl at Corlo island. Before passing away, Geppetto tells Josette to leave Corlo for Blueland island, where she will meet someone to help her. However, Blueland is occupied by the Siliconian Army harvesting Proton, a mineral fuel source.

Development 

Givro Corporation began talks of a sequel to Wonder Project J quickly after its December 1994 release.

Release 
Wonder Project J2 was first released for the Nintendo 64 by Enix in Japan on November 22, 1996, packaged with a game-themed Controller Pak. Interest about the game was sparked in North America by previews from western publications such as Electronic Gaming Monthly, Next Generation and Nintendo Power, the latter of which featured it in their "Epic Center" section as one of its last appearances before the aforementioned section was discontinued due to lack of role-playing games on Nintendo 64. When asked about a possible North American release from Nintendo by GameFan, then-Nintendo Treehouse member Jim Henrick stated he did not know when it would be published, as Enix ceased distribution of their titles in the region.  Though initially planned as a Nintendo 64 exclusive, Enix later announced a PlayStation port with additional animated sequences which would not fit within the memory limitations of the Nintendo 64 Game Pak in 1997, but this version was never released. Despite never being officially published outside Japan, a fan translation was released in 2007. Square Enix later re-released the title as a two-part download for mobile phones in Japan on April 12, 2010.

Reception 

Wonder Project J2 received largely positive reviews. Famitsu gave it a score of 33 out of 40. GameSpot gave it a 5.2 out of 10 score. N64 Magazine gave it 55%. 64 Extreme gave it 75%. German magazine Total! praised the game. 1UP.com noted that the 3D sections felt awkward. Nintendo Life strongly praised the game.

Notes

References

External links 
 
 Wonder Project J2 at GameFAQs
 Wonder Project J2 at Giant Bomb
 Wonder Project J2 at MobyGames

1996 video games
Cancelled PlayStation (console) games
Enix games
Givro Corporation games
IOS games
Japan-exclusive video games
Manga series
Nintendo 64 games
Raising sims
Fiction about robots
Video games about robots
Video games developed in Japan
Video games featuring female protagonists
Video games featuring non-playable protagonists
Video games scored by Akihiko Mori